The St. Louis Cardinals 2003 season was the team's 122nd season in St. Louis, Missouri and the 112th season in the National League.  The Cardinals went 85-77 during the season and finished 3rd in the National League Central division, three games behind the Chicago Cubs, who won the NL Central at 88-74, and two behind the NL Central runners-up, the Houston Astros (87-75).

Catcher Mike Matheny, shortstop Édgar Rentería, third baseman Scott Rolen, and outfielder Jim Edmonds won Gold Gloves this year.

Offseason
December 13, 2002: Chris Carpenter was signed as a free agent with the St. Louis Cardinals.

Regular season

Opening Day starters
Jim Edmonds
Eli Marrero
Tino Martinez
Mike Matheny
Matt Morris
Albert Pujols
Édgar Rentería
Scott Rolen
Fernando Viña

Season standings

National League Central

Record vs. opponents

Transactions
May 27, 2003: Scott Seabol was signed as a free agent with the St. Louis Cardinals.

Game log

|- bgcolor=#cfc
|1 || March 31 || Brewers || 11–9 || Springer || DeJean || Kline || 49,561 || 1–0
|-

|- bgcolor=#cfc
| 2 || April 2 || Brewers || 7–0 || W. Williams || Rusch ||  || 26,790 || 2–0
|- bgcolor=#cfc
| 3 || April 3 || Brewers || 6–4 || Stephenson || Kinney || Kline || 26,952 || 3–0
|- bgcolor=#fbb
| 4 || April 4 || Astros || 5–6 || Stone || Springer || Lidge || 32,661 || 3–1
|- bgcolor=#fbb
| 5 || April 5 || Astros || 1–2 || Munro || Fassero || Wagner || 33,878 ||3–2
|- bgcolor=#cfc
| 6 || April 8 || @ Rockies || 15–12 || Eldred || Miceli ||  ||21,563 || 4–2
|- bgcolor=#fbb
| 7 || April 9 || @ Rockies || 4–9 || Cruz || Tomko ||  || 24,110 || 4–3
|- bgcolor=#fbb
| 8 || April 10 || @ Rockies || 6–7 || Lopez || Kline || Jimenez ||24,586 || 4–4
|- bgcolor=#fbb
| 9 || April 11 || @ Astros || 2–3 || Dotel || Morris ||  || 25,185 || 4–5
|- bgcolor=#cfc
| 10 || Apr 12 || @ Astros || 3–0 || W. Williams || Redding || Hermanson || 33,509 || 5–5
|- bgcolor=#cfc
| 11 || April 13 || @ Astros || 11–8 || Calero || Oswalt ||  || 30,078 || 6–5
|- bgcolor=#cfc
| 12 || April 14 || @ Brewers || 7–5 || Tomko || Ritchie || Kline || 10,684 || 7–5
|- bgcolor=#fbb
| 13 || April 15 || @ Brewers || 1–6 || Sheets || Stephenson ||  || 12,149 || 7–6
|- bgcolor=#cfc
| 14 || April 16 || @ Brewers || 15–2 || Morris || Franklin ||  || 12,387 || 8–6
|- bgcolor=#cfc
| 15 || April 18 || D'Backs || 6–3 || W. Williams || Dessens ||  || 36,239 || 9–6
|- bgcolor=#fbb
|16 || April 19 || D'Backs || 3–4 || Kim || Simontacchi || Mantei || 38,742 || 9–7
|- bgcolor=#fbb
| 17 || April 20 || D'Backs || 0–1 || Villarreal || Tomko || Mantei || 26,152 || 9–8
|- bgcolor=#fbb
| 18 || April 22 || @ Braves || 3–5 || Ortiz || Stephenson || Smoltz || 20,969 || 9–9
|- bgcolor=#fbb
| 19 || April 23 || @ Braves || 2–4 || Maddux || Morris || Smoltz || 21,338 || 9–10
|- bgcolor=#fbb
| 20 || April 24 || @ Braves || 3–4 || King || Kline ||  || 24,184 || 9–11
|- bgcolor=#cfc
| 21 || April 25 || @ Marlins || 9–2 || Tomko || Burnett ||  || 12,081 || 10–11
|- bgcolor=#fbb
| 22 || April 26 || @ Marlins || 3–5 || Beckett || Kline || Looper || 12,286 || 10–12
|- bgcolor=#cfc
| 23 || April 27 || @ Marlins || 7–6 || Kline || Pavano ||  || 10,075 || 11–12
|- bgcolor=#cfc
| 24 || April 29 || Mets || 13–3 || Morris || Leiter ||  || 30,275 || 12–12
|- bgcolor=#cfc
| 25 || April 30 || Mets || 13–4 || W. Williams || Astacio ||  || 30,265 || 13–12
|-

|- bgcolor=#cfc
| 26 || May 1 || Mets || 6–5 || Eldred || Strickland ||  || 35,283 || 14–12
|- bgcolor=#cfc
| 27 || May 2 || Expos || 8–1 || Simontacchi || Ohka ||  || 41,810 || 15–12
|- bgcolor=#cfc
| 28 || May 3 || Expos || 3–1 || Stephenson || Vargas || Calero || 36,176 || 16–12
|- bgcolor=#cfc
| 29 || May 4 || Expos || 6–2 || Morris || Vazquez ||  || 39,605 || 17–12
|- bgcolor=#fbb
| 30 || May 5 || @ Reds || 4–5 || Williamson || Hermanson ||  || 20,145 || 17–13
|- bgcolor=#fbb
| 31 || May 6 || @ Reds || 5–6 || Reitsma || Calero ||  || 25,917 || 17–14
|- bgcolor=#fbb
| 32 || May 7 || @ Reds || 2–4 || Graves || Simontacchi || Williamson || 20,849 || 17–15
|- bgcolor=#fbb
| 33 || May 8 || @ Reds || 6–8 || Sullivan || Crudale || Williamson || 30,567 || 17–16
|- bgcolor=#cfc
| 34 || May 9 || @ Cubs || 6–3 || Morris || Zambrano || Fassero || 38,531 || 18–16
|- bgcolor=#fbb
|| 35 || May 10 || @ Cubs || 2–3 || Remlinger || Eldred ||  || 38,106 || 18–17
|- bgcolor=#fbb
| 36 || May 13 || Reds || 2–7 || Wilson || Simontacchi ||  || 34,276 || 18–18
|- bgcolor=#fbb
| 37 || May 14 || Reds || 0–4 || Graves || Morris ||  || 31,731 || 18–19
|- bgcolor=#cfc
| 38 || May 15 || Reds || 6–3 || Stephenson || Riedling || Eldred || 37,904 || 19–19
|- bgcolor=#cfc
|39 || May 16 || Cubs || 7–4 || W. Williams || Clement || Eldred || 42,589 || 20–19
|- bgcolor=#fbb
| 40 || May 17 || Cubs || 1–2 || Remlinger || Kline || Borowski || 45,385 || 20–20
|- bgcolor=#cfc
|41 || May 18 || Cubs || 6–3 || Hermanson || Cruz || Eldred || 45,773 || 21–20
|- bgcolor=#cfc
| 42 || May 19 || Cubs || 2–0 || Morris || Zambrano ||  || 46,734 || 22–20
|- bgcolor=#fbb
| 43 || May 20 || @ Astros || 2–3 || Miller || Stephenson || Wagner || 23,623 || 22–21
|- bgcolor=#cfc
| 44 || May 21 || @ Astros || 7–4 || W. Williams || Munro || Eldred || 22,441 || 23–21
|- bgcolor=#fbb
| 45 || May 22 || @ Astros || 2–5 || Robertson || Tomko || Wagner || 23,866 || 23–22
|- bgcolor=#cfc
| 46 || May 23 || @ Pirates || 10–8 || Eldred || Meadows || Fassero || 18,660 || 24–22
|- bgcolor=#cfc
| 47 || May 24 || @ Pirates || 6–0 || Morris || Suppan ||  || 35,733 || 25–22
|- bgcolor=#fbb
| 48 || May 25 || @ Pirates || 7–8 || Boehringer || Hermanson || M. Williams || 25,983 || 25–23
|- bgcolor=#cfc
| 49 || May 26 || Astros || 10–5 || W. Williams || Munro ||  || 35,600 || 26–23
|- bgcolor=#fbb
| 50 || May 27 || Astros || 4–7 || Robertson || Tomko || Wagner || 32,476 || 26–24
|- bgcolor=#cfc
| 51 ||  May 28 || Astros || 3–1 || Simontacchi || Johnson ||  || 28,667 || 27–24
|- bgcolor=#fbb
| 52 || May 29 || Astros || 4–7 || Saarloos || Fassero || Wagner || 41,977 || 27–25
|- bgcolor=#fbb
| 53 || May 30 || Pirates || 3–7 || Suppan || Stephenson ||  || 30,599 || 27–26
|- bgcolor=#fbb
| 54 || May 31 || Pirates || 3–4 || Wells || W. Williams || M. Williams || 43,789 || 27–27
|-

|- bgcolor=#cfc
| 55 || June 1 || Pirates || 5–4 || Kline || Beimel || Fassero || 46,103 || 28–27
|- bgcolor=#cfc
| 56 || June 3 || Blue Jays || 11–5 || Morris || Escobar ||  ||28,907 || 29–27
|- bgcolor=#cfc
| 57 || June 4 || Blue Jays || 8–5 || Simontacchi || Lidle || Eldred || 28,840 || 30–27
|- bgcolor=#cfc
| 58 || June 5 || Blue Jays  || 13–5 || W. Williams || Hendrickson ||  || 33,729 || 31–27
|- bgcolor=#cfc
| 59 || June 6 || Orioles || 8–6 || Yan || Julio || Eldred || 34,817 || 32–27
|- bgcolor=#fbb
| 60 || June 7 || Orioles || 1–8 || Ponson || Stephenson ||  || 43,369 || 32–28
|- bgcolor=#cfc
| 61 || June 8 || Orioles || 11–10 || Simontacchi || Driskill || Eldred ||33,313 || 33–28
|- bgcolor=#cfc
| 62 || June 10 || @ Red Sox || 9–7 || Kline || Lyon || Eldred || 34,937 || 34–28
|- bgcolor=#fbb
| 63 || June 11 || @ Red Sox || 1–13 || Burkett || Tomko ||  || 33,453 || 34–29
|- bgcolor=#cfc
| 64 || June 12 || @ Red Sox || 8–7 || Yan || Mendoza ||  || 34,389 || 35–29
|- bgcolor=#fbb
| 65 || June 13 || @ Yankees || 2–5 || Clemens || Simontacchi || Rivera || 55,214 || 35–30
|- bgcolor=#fbb
| 66 || June 14 || @ Yankees || 4–13 || Pettitte || Morris ||  || 55,174 || 35–31
|- bgcolor=#fbb
| 67 || June 15 || @ Yankees || 2–5 || Mussina || W. Williams || Rivera || 54,797 || 35–32
|- bgcolor=#fbb
| 68 || June 16 || @ Brewers || 4–9 || Leskanic || Eldred ||  || 24,951 || 35–33
|- bgcolor=#cfc
| 69 || June 17 || @ Brewers || 12–3 || Stephenson || Kinney ||  || 16,659 || 36–33
|- bgcolor=#cfc
| 70 || June 18 || @ Brewers || 9–1 || Simontacchi || Rusch ||  || 17,495 || 37–33
|- bgcolor=#cfc
| 71 || June 19 || @ Brewers || 8–4 || Tomko || Quevedo || Isringhausen || 20,776 || 38–33
|- bgcolor=#fbb
| 72 || June 20 || Royals || 4–10 || Lima || Morris ||  || 38,226 || 38–34
|- bgcolor=#cfc
| 73 || June 21 || Royals || 8–1 || W. Williams || May ||  || 44,473 || 39–34
|- bgcolor=#fbb
| 74 || June 22 || Royals || 2–5 || Affeldt || Stephenson || MacDougal || 39,962 || 39–35
|- bgcolor=#fbb
| 75 || June 24 || Reds || 4–7 || Heredia || Fassero || Graves || 33,352 || 39–36
|- bgcolor=#cfc
| 76 || June 25 || Reds || 9–6 || Morris || Wilson || Isringhausen || 34,863 || 40–36
|- bgcolor=#cfc
| 77 || June 26 || Reds || 11–7 || W. Williams || Anderson ||  || 34,738 || 41–36
|- bgcolor=#fbb
| 78 || June 27 || @ Royals || 3–6 || May || Stephenson || MacDougal || 40,189 || 41–37
|- bgcolor=#cfc
| 79 || June 28 || @ Royals || 13–9 || Fassero || Affeldt ||  || 40,347 || 42–37
|- bgcolor=#cfc
| 80 || June 29 || @ Royals || 13–6 || Tomko || George ||  || 38,270 || 43–37
|- bgcolor=#fbb
| 81 || June 30 || Giants || 1–5 || Schmidt || Haren ||  ||33,873 || 43–38
|-

|- bgcolor=#fbb
| 82 || July 1 || Giants || 1–5 || Brower || W. Williams ||  || 39,894 || 43–39
|- bgcolor=#cfc
| 83 || July 2 || Giants || 1–4 || J. Williams || Stephenson || Worrell || 33,835 || 43–40
|- bgcolor=#cfc
| 84 || July 3 || Giants || 9–5 || Simontacchi || Rueter ||  || 38,129 || 44–40
|- bgcolor=#cfc
| 85 || July 4 || @ Cubs || 11–8 || Tomko || Wood ||  ||39,756 || 45–40
|- bgcolor=#fbb
| 86 || July 5 || @ Cubs || 5–6 || Remlinger || Fassero ||  || 38,953 || 45–41
|- bgcolor=#cfc
| 87 || July 6 || @ Cubs || 4–1 || W. Williams || Prior || Isringhausen || 37,713 || 46–41
|- bgcolor=#fbb
| 88 || July 7 || @ Giants || 1–5 || J. Williams || Stephenson ||  ||42,674 || 46–42
|- bgcolor=#fbb
| 89 || July 8 || @ Giants || 3–8 || Brower || Haren ||  || 42,672 || 46–43
|- bgcolor=#fbb
| 90 || July 9 || Dodgers || 5–6 || Ishii || Tomko || Gagné || 32,325 || 46–44
|- bgcolor=#fbb
| 91 || July 10 || Dodgers || 4–9 || Perez || Morris || Quantrill || 35,610 || 46–45
|- bgcolor=#cfc
| 92 || July 11 || Padres || 4–2 || W. Williams || Lawrence || Isringhausen ||33,725 || 47–45
|- bgcolor=#cfc
| 93 || July 12 || Padres || 9–7 || Simontacchi || Herges  ||  || 48,774 || 48–45
|- bgcolor=#cfc
| 94 || July 13 || Padres || 3–1 || Simontacchi || Matthews || Isringhausen || 48,102 || 49–45
|- bgcolor=#fbb
| 95 || July 17 || @ Dodgers || 3–6 || Nomo || Stephenson || Gagné || 40,331 || 49–46
|- bgcolor=#fbb
| 96 || July 18 || @ Dodgers || 5–8 || Ishii || Eldred || Gagné || 43,504 || 49–47
|- bgcolor=#cfc
| 97 || July 19 || @ Dodgers || 3–1 || Haren || Brown || Isringhausen || 41,195 || 50–47
|- bgcolor=#cfc
| 98 || July 20 || @ Dodgers || 10–7 || W. Williams || Perez || Isringhausen || 46,110 || 51–47
|- bgcolor=#fbb
| 99 || July 21 || @ Padres || 4–5 || Witasick || Painter ||  || 26,881 || 51–48
|- bgcolor=#fbb
| 100 || July 22 || @ Padres || 2–3 || Pérez || Fassero || Beck || 22,291 || 51–49
|- bgcolor=#cfc
| 101 || July 23 || @ Padres || 8–4 || Tomko || Lawrence ||  || 20,574 || 52–49
|- bgcolor=#fbb
| 102 || July 25 || Pirates || 5–10|| Meadows || Eldred ||  || 45,296 || 52–50
|- bgcolor=#cfc
| 103 || July 26 || Pirates || 13–8 || W. Williams || Fogg || Isringhausen || 44,249 || 53–50
|- bgcolor=#cfc
| 104 || July 27 || Pirates || 4–3 || Eldred || Lincoln ||  || 34,851 || 54–50
|- bgcolor=#fbb
| 105 || July 28 || Pirates || 0–3 || Suppan || Tomko ||  || 33,977 || 54–51
|- bgcolor=#cfc
| 106 || July 29 || @ Expos || 2–1 || Stephenson || Hernandez ||  || 7,418 || 55–51
|- bgcolor=#cfc
| 107 || July 30 || @ Expos || 11–1 || Haren || Vargas ||  || 6,129 || 56–51
|- bgcolor=#fbb
| 108 || July 31 || @ Expos || 2–3 || Day || W. Williams || Biddle || 9,145 || 56–52
|-

|- bgcolor=#cfc
| 109 || August 1 || @ Mets || 8–2 || Kline || Wheeler ||  ||23,578 || 57–52
|- bgcolor=#cfc
| 110 || August 2 || @ Mets || 10–9 || Tomko || Seo || Yan || 30,898 || 58–52
|- bgcolor=#fbb
| 111 || August 3 || @ Mets || 5–13 || Griffiths || Stephenson ||  || 27,592 || 58–53
|- bgcolor=#fbb
| 112 || August 5 || Marlins || 0–4 || Penny || W. Williams ||  || 35,468 || 58–54
|- bgcolor=#fbb
| 113 || August 6 || Marlins || 3–7 || Willis || Haren ||  || 31,606 || 58–55
|- bgcolor=#cfc
| 114 || August 7 || Marlins || 3–0 || Tomko || Beckett || Isringhausen || 31,002 || 59–55
|- bgcolor=#fbb
| 115 || August 8 || Braves || 2–7 || Ortiz || Fassero ||  || 45,796 || 59–56
|- bgcolor=#cfc
| 116 || August 9 || Braves || 3–1 || Stephenson || Reynolds || Isringhausen || 47,692 || 60–56
|- bgcolor=#cfc
| 117 || August 10 || Braves || 3–2 || Eldred || Smoltz || Isringhausen || 39,320 || 61–56
|- bgcolor=#cfc
| 118 || August 11 || @ Pirates || 6–4 || Haren || Wells || Isringhausen || 17,647 || 62–56
|- bgcolor=#cfc
| 119 || August 12 || @ Pirates || 10–6 || Tomko || Fogg || Simontacchi || 21,013 || 63–56
|- bgcolor=#fbb
| 120 || August 13 || @ Pirates || 5–6 || Tavárez || Borbón ||  || 18,505 || 63–57
|- bgcolor=#cfc
| 121 || August 14 || @ Pirates || 4–3 || Stephenson || D'Amico || Isringhausen || 16,157 || 64–57
|- bgcolor=#fbb
| 122 || August 15 || @ Phillies || 4–7 || Padilla || W. Williams || Plesac || 28,962 || 64–58
|- bgcolor=#fbb
| 123 || August 16 || @ Phillies || 4–5 || Myers || Haren || Mesa || 35,046 || 64–59
|- bgcolor=#fbb
| 124 || August 17 || @ Phillies || 4–6 || Telemaco || Tomko || M. Williams || 42,153 || 64–60
|- bgcolor=#cfc
| 125 || August 19 || Pirates || 13–5 || Eldred || Beimel ||  || 28,869 || 65–60
|- bgcolor=#fbb
| 126 || August 20 || Pirates || 0–14 || D'Amico || Stephenson ||  || 25,741 || 65–61
|- bgcolor=#cfc
| 127 || August 21 || Pirates || 6–3 || Eldred || Lincoln ||  || 26,849 || 66–61
|- bgcolor=#fbb
| 128 || August 22 || Phillies || 4–9 || Cormier || Kline ||  || 33,824 || 66–62
|- bgcolor=#cfc
| 129 || August 23 || Phillies || 5–3 || Hitchcock || Telemaco || Isringhausen || 37,318 || 67–62
|- bgcolor=#cfc
| 130 || August 24 || Phillies || 3–0 || Tomko || Millwood || DeJean || 37,679 || 68–62
|- bgcolor=#fbb
| 131 || August 26 || Cubs || 4–7 || Prior || Stephenson ||  || 36,563 || 68–63
|- bgcolor=#cfc
| 132 || August 27 || Cubs || 4–2 || Kline || Farnsworth || Isringhausen || 32,667 || 69–63
|- bgcolor=#cfc
| 133 || August 28 || Cubs || 3–2 || DeJean || Remlinger ||  || 37,370 || 70–63
|- bgcolor=#fbb
| 134 || August 29 || @ Reds || 5–8 || Bale || Haren || Graves || 27,121 || 70–64
|- bgcolor=#cfc
| 135 || August 30 || @ Reds || 6–3 || Tomko || Harang || Isringhausen || 39,380 || 71–64
|- bgcolor=#cfc
| 136 || August 31 || @ Reds || 5–0 || Hitchcock || Serafini ||  || 29,272 || 72–64
|-

|- bgcolor=#fbb
| 137 || September 1 || @ Cubs || 0–7 || Prior || W. Williams ||  || 38,410 || 72–65
|- bgcolor=#fbb
| 138 || September 2 || @ Cubs || 2–4 || Guthrie || Fassero ||  || 31,990 || 72–66
|- bgcolor=#cfc
| 139 || September 2 (2) || @ Cubs || 2–0 || Morris || Wood || Isringhausen || 39,290 || 73–66
|- bgcolor=#fbb
| 140 || September 3 || @ Cubs || 7–8 || Borowski || W. Williams ||  || 32,710 || 73–67
|- bgcolor=#fbb
| 141 || September 4 || @ Cubs || 6–7 || Remlinger || DeJean || Borowski || 35,129 || 73–68
|- bgcolor=#fbb
| 142 || September 5 || Reds || 2–4 || Randall || Simontacchi || Reitsma || 29,608 || 73–69
|- bgcolor=#cfc
| 143 || September 6 || Reds || 13–6 || W. Williams || Serafini ||  || 39,718 || 74–69
|- bgcolor=#cfc
| 144 || September 7 || Reds || 9–0 || Morris || Etherton ||  || 34,389 || 75–69
|- bgcolor=#fbb
| 145 || September 9 || Rockies || 1–8 || Jennings || Haren ||  || 27,591 || 75–70
|- bgcolor=#cfc
| 146 || September 10 || Rockies || 10–2 || Tomko || Elarton ||  || 25,396 || 76–70
|- bgcolor=#fbb
| 147 || September 11 || Rockies || 4–9 ||Oliver || Hitchcock ||  || 28,801 || 76–71
|- bgcolor=#fbb
| 148 || September 12 || @ Astros || 5–14 || Miller || W. Williams ||  || 35,633 || 76–72
|- bgcolor=#fbb
| 149 || September 13 || @ Astros || 0–2 || Oswalt || Morris || Wagner || 42,435 || 76–73
|- bgcolor=#fbb
| 150 || September 14 || @ Astros || 1–4 || Redding || Haren || Wagner || 37,548 || 76–74
|- bgcolor=#cfc
| 151 || September 15 || Brewers || 11–2 || Tomko || Obermueller ||  || 27,925 || 77–74
|- bgcolor=#cfc
| 152 || September 16 || Brewers || 6–5 || Hitchcock || L. Martinez || Isringhausen || 27,405 || 78–74
|- bgcolor=#fbb
| 153 || September 17 || Brewers || 6–7 || Estrella || Isringhausen || Kolb || 27,567 || 78–75
|- bgcolor=#cfc
| 154 || September 18 || Brewers || 13–0 || W. Williams || Kinney ||  || 29,729 || 79–75
|- bgcolor=#fbb
| 155 || September 19 || Astros || 1–8 || Oswalt || Morris ||  || 38,997 || 79–76
|- bgcolor=#cfc
| 156 || September 20 || Astros || 3–2 || Simontacchi || Miceli ||  || 44,878 || 80–76
|- bgcolor=#cfc
| 157 || September 21 || Astros || 6–4 || Hitchcock || Robertson || Isringhausen || 41,397 || 81–76
|- bgcolor=#cfc
| 158 || September 23 || @ Brewers || 5–1 || W. Williams || Sheets ||  || 15,042 || 82–76
|- bgcolor=#cfc
| 159 || September 24 || @ Brewers || 8–4 || Morris || Kinney || Isringhausen || 21,965 || 83–76
|- bgcolor=#fbb
| 160 || September 26 || @ D'Backs || 6–7 || Randolph || Tomko || Mantei || 37,180 || 83–77
|- bgcolor=#cfc
| 161 || September 27 || @ D'Backs || 3–2 || Hitchcock || Capuano || Isringhausen || 39,650 || 84–77
|- bgcolor=#cfc
| 162 || September 28 || @ D'Backs || 9–5 || W. Williams || Webb || Isringhausen || 42,882 || 85–77
|-

Roster

Player stats

Batting

Starters by position 
Note: Pos = Position; G = Games played; AB = At bats; H = Hits; Avg. = Batting average; HR = Home runs; RBI = Runs batted in

Other batters 
Note: G = Games played; AB = At bats; H = Hits; Avg. = Batting average; HR = Home runs; RBI = Runs batted in

Pitching

Starting pitchers 
Note: G = Games pitched; IP = Innings pitched; W = Wins; L = Losses; ERA = Earned run average; SO = Strikeouts

Other pitchers 
Note: G = Games pitched; IP = Innings pitched; W = Wins; L = Losses; ERA = Earned run average; SO = Strikeouts

Relief pitchers 
Note: G = Games pitched; W = Wins; L = Losses; SV = Saves; ERA = Earned run average; SO = Strikeouts

Farm system

References

External links
2003 St. Louis Cardinals at Baseball Reference
2003 St. Louis Cardinals team page at www.baseball-almanac.com

St. Louis Cardinals seasons
Saint Louis Cardinals season
St. Louis Cardinals